The Mid-Suburban League (MSL) is an Illinois High School Association recognized high school extra-curricular league which includes 12 schools located in the northwest suburbs of Chicago, Illinois.  The conference is split up into two divisions for all interscholastic activities. The primary criteria for the separate divisions is geography, with the schools in the West Division being located west of IL Route 53 and the schools of the East Division being east of it.  However, the schools of the western division are also larger than the schools of the eastern division.

Members

West Division

East Division

History
The Mid-Suburban League came into existence for the 1963–64 school year.  The MSL and Des Plaines Valley League both broke off from an interim suburban league that dated back several decades.  The original members of the MSL were Deerfield High School, Forest View High School, Glenbrook North High School, Glenbrook South High School,  Maine West High School, and Prospect High School.  Not even a year old, the conference announced expansion for the 1965–66 season with, Palatine High School, Wheeling High School, Niles North High School, and New Trier West High School joining as the schools opened.  The MSL then announced a realignment for the 1965–66 season when Niles West High School and James B. Conant High School were added, with Deerfield, Glenbrook North, Glenbrook South, Niles West, Niles North, and New Trier West comprising one division, and Forest View, Prospect, Wheeling, Maine West, and James Conant comprising the other.

Just prior to the start of the 1964–65 season, it was announced that Arlington High School would join the league for the 1966–67 season, leaving the West Suburban Conference, and joining the division which included Forest View High School and soon to open school Elk Grove High School and 5 year old high school Fremd. Maine West left the league in 1967 and moved to the Central Suburban. Glenbard North joined the league in 1968, and Hersey in 1969, closing out the final changes in the conference of the 1960's. 

The conference would change again in the early 1970's as Schaumburg was added in 1970, Rolling Meadows in 1971, Buffalo Grove in 1974 and Hoffman Estates in 1975. At the conclusion of the 1973 school year, Glenbard North would leave for the Du Page Valley Conference, however, in 1977, Barrington would come over from the North Suburban Conference. Unfortunately, in 1984, based on declining enrollment and high maintenance costs, Arlington High School would close with Forest View seeing the same fate 2 years later.

Membership timeline

References

External links
 Mid-Suburban League homepage

High school sports conferences and leagues in the United States
Illinois high school sports conferences
High school sports in Illinois